Panther Creek is a stream in Webster and Laclede counties in the Ozarks of south-central Missouri. It is a tributary of the Osage Fork Gasconade River.

Panther Creek was named for the panthers which once roamed its course.

See also
List of rivers of Missouri

References

Rivers of Laclede County, Missouri
Rivers of Webster County, Missouri
Rivers of Missouri
Tributaries of the Gasconade River